Franz Mandl (1923–2009) was a British theoretical physicist, known for his graduate-level textbooks.

Early life and education 
Mandl was born in Vienna in 1923 into a Jewish family. They moved to Berlin in the 1920s, and after the rise of Nazi Germany, the family emigrated to England as refugees in 1936. Mandl received a scholarship to study at Lincoln College, Oxford where he received his undergraduate and doctorate degrees in physics.

Academic career 
After receiving his doctorate, Mandl spent a few years in the US, before returning to the UK to become a reader of physics at the University of Manchester. He spent his career there collaborating in atomic research and writing textbooks. His books were considered influential to the graduate study of theoretical physics.

Personal life and death 
Mandl married Betty Clifford, a mathematician whom he met while studying at Oxford.

He died in 2009 at the age of 85.

Works

Books

Technical reports and lectures

References 

1923 births
2009 deaths
20th-century British physicists
Austrian emigrants to Germany
German emigrants to the United Kingdom
Alumni of Lincoln College, Oxford